Lake Beale is a lake located in Nashik District, in Maharashtra, India. The estimate terrain elevation above sea level is 547 metres. It is a storage reservoir created in 1911 by the Darna Dam on the Darna River.

References

Lakes of Maharashtra